Elizabeth Furnace was a blast furnace in the Shenandoah Valley that was used to create pig iron from 1836 to 1888 using Passage Creek for water power. Iron ore was mined nearby, purified in the furnace, and then pig iron was transported over the Massanutten Mountain to the South Fork of the Shenandoah River for forging in Harpers Ferry, West Virginia. The road used to transport this iron is still used today by hikers climbing to the top of the Massanutten Mountain via the Massanutten Trail. Much of the original stone structure still exists, as well as a restored cabin, and an outdoor recreation area.

Elizabeth Furnace Recreation Area
The Elizabeth Furnace Recreation Area, located in George Washington National Forest just north of Fort Valley, Virginia, consists of three main areas: the group camping area, the picnic area and the family camping area.

There is a trout hatchery near Passage Creek where a fishing license is required.

References

History of Virginia
Parks in Shenandoah County, Virginia
Buildings and structures in Shenandoah County, Virginia
George Washington and Jefferson National Forests
Ironworks in Virginia
1836 establishments in Virginia
1886 disestablishments in the United States
Virginia Historic Landmarks
Companies established in 1836
Foundries